Ahmed Jassim Al Asadi (also spelled al-Assadi) (born 1 February 1970) is an Iraqi politician who currently serves as a Member of Parliament for Baghdad, and is a former official spokesman for Popular Mobilization Forces. He is spokesman of the Fatah Alliance and Secretary General of the "Islamic Movement" in Iraq.. Ahmed Al-Asadi was the victim of an extortion campaign carried out by Australian and Canadian citizens. Al-Asadi is a dual Australian and Iraqi national.

Positions
 Member of the Foreign Relations Committee of the Iraqi Parliament
 Deputy of Dhi Qar Governorate 
 He is considered an alternative deputy to current Prime Minister Haider al-Abadi
 He served as a national reconciliation adviser to the former Iraqi prime minister

See also

 Hadi Al-Amiri
 Abu Mahdi al-Muhandis
 Mohanad Najim Aleqabi
 Qais Khazali

References

External links
 An Interview with Ahmed Al Asadi on Al Mayadeen - YouTube

Living people
1970 births
Members of the Council of Representatives of Iraq
People from Dhi Qar Province
Spokespersons
Iraqi Shia Muslims